Technical University of Mombasa (TUM) is a public university located in the coastal city of Mombasa, Kenya Tudor, along Tom Mboya avenue. It is amongst the oldest institution of higher learning in Kenya. It is one of the National Polytechnics recently elevated to a fully fledged University in Kenya. It was awarded its charter in 2013 by-then president Mwai Kibaki.

Schools

 School of Engineering & technology
 School of Applied and Health Sciences
 School of Business
 Institute of Computing and Informatics
 School of Humanities and Social Sciences
 School of Medicine
 Institute of Research, Innovation and Extension (ARIE)

TUM history
TUM can be traced back to the late 1940s when Sir Philip Mitchell, Aga Khan III, the Sultan of Zanzibar, and Secretary of State for the colonies, Sir Bernard Reilly started the Mombasa Institute of Muslim Education (MIOME). After its inception, MIOME started providing technical education to Muslim students of East Africa. In May 1951, MIOME enrolled its first batch of students to undergo a technical education programme which placed special emphasis on Mechanical Engineering, Electrical Engineering, Seamanship and Navigation, and Woodwork.

In 1966 MIOME become Mombasa Technical Institute (MTI) and started to admit all people from different walks of life regardless of religion or race.

In the year 1976, MTI became Mombasa Polytechnic. Mombasa Polytechnic continued to develop more market driven programs, anchored on the five established Departments of Business Studies, Electrical and Electronics Engineering, Building and Civil Engineering, Mechanical Engineering and Applied Sciences.
On 23 August 2007, through a Legal Notice Mombasa Polytechnic was elevated to a University College thus the name Mombasa Polytechnic University College (MPUC).

In 2013 after being elevated to a fully fledged University Mombasa Polytechnic University College (MPUC) became Technical University of Mombasa (TUM). TUM has opened two strategic satellite Campuses in Kwale and Lamu County.

Directorates
 Directorate of TVET
 Directorate of Quality Assurance
 TUM Entreprises (TUMEL)
 School of Graduate Studies

Campuses
 Main Campus, Tudor, Mombasa
 Lamu Campus
 Kwale Campus

See also
 Education in Kenya
 Universities in Kenya
 Technical University of Kenya

References

External links 
 Technical University

Education in Mombasa
Universities in Kenya